Kakhaber Tskhadadze (born 7 September 1968) is a Georgian football manager and former player. He is the manager of Kazakhstani club Caspiy.

As a player he was defender who notably played in the Bundesliga for Eintracht Frankfurt, in the Premier League for Manchester City and in the Russian Premier League for Spartak Moscow, Dynamo Moscow, Alania Vladikavkaz and Anzhi Makhachkala. He has also played for Metalurg Rustavi, Lokomotivi Tbilisi, Dinamo Tbilisi and GIF Sundsvall. He was capped 6 times by Soviet Union and 25 times for Georgia.

Moving into management in 2001 he was initially player/manager of Lokomotivi Tbilisi, before returning to Dinamo Tbilisi in 2005. He has since gone on to manage Sioni Bolnisi, Standard Baku, Georgia U-21, Inter Baku, Georgia, FC Kairat, FC Ordabasy before returning once more to Dinamo in 2021.

Club career
Tskhadadze's club career started in 1986 in Dinamo Tbilisi. He became known in Western Europe with German team Eintracht Frankfurt, who he joined in 1992. After a couple of successful seasons he gradually found himself struggling for a first team place, and in 1997 he joined Alania Vladikavkaz. After a short time he was bought by English team Manchester City, where he teamed up with fellow Georgians Murtaz Shelia (a former teammate) and Georgi Kinkladze. Tskhadadze's time at the Manchester club was fraught with injury forcing the team to buy other central defenders such as Andy Morrison. In March 2000 he was released from the club. He then played for Lokomotiv Tbilisi and Anzhi Makhachkala until he retired and was appointed head coach for Dinamo Tbilisi.

International career
In 1990 Tskhadadze played five matches for the Soviet Union national under-21 team, who won the 1990 UEFA European Under-21 Championship tournament. In 1992, he earned six caps and scored one goal for CIS, including one appearance at Euro 92. He later became a part of the recently formed Georgia national team, and played 25 matches in total, captaining the side. His only goal for Georgia came in a 1997 World Cup qualifier against Poland, and his last match was played on 30 May 1998 against Russia.

Managerial career
From March 2005 Kakhaber was appointed as Head coach of FC Dinamo Tbilisi and won the Georgian Championship and Supercup in the same year.
 
In January 2006 he became the manager of FC Sioni Bolnisi and won the first ever Championship trophy for the club.

Year 2009 Kakhaber Tskhadadze Started coaching Inter Baku and won the Azerbaijan Premier League title in his first year at the club, following up with winning the CIS cup in 2011.

In December 2014, he was appointed as the new coach of Georgia.

On 7 April 2016, Tskhadadze was appointed as manager of FC Kairat. He managed to win the Kazakhstan Supercup and led the team to the Kazakhstan cup final, but resigned just before the team won the trophy. Tskhadadze resigned as manager of Kairat on 21 July 2017 following their elimination from the Europa League.

His second spell at Dinamo Tbilisi began in May 2021, which lasted one year.

On 13 November 2022, Tskhadadze was appointed as manager of FC Caspiy.

Personal life
Tskhadadze is the father of former Georgian national team player Bachana Tskhadadze.

Managerial statistics

Honours

Player
Dinamo Tbilisi
Georgian Premier League: 1990, 1991

Spartak Moscow
Russian Football Premier League: 1992
Soviet Cup: 1991–92

Manchester City
Football League Second Division playoff winner

Soviet Union U21
1990 UEFA European Under-21 Championship Gold medal

Manager
Dinamo Tbilisi
Georgian Super Cup: 2005
Erovnuli Liga: 2004–2005

FC Sioni Bolnisi
Erovnuli Liga: 2005–2006

Inter Baku
Azerbaijan Premier League: 2009–10
Commonwealth of Independent States Cup: 2011

Kairat
Kazakhstan Super Cup: 2017

References

External links
 Profile on Soccerway
 RSSSF.com
 homecourt.de 
 Kakhaber Tskhadadze at eintracht-archiv.de 

1968 births
Living people
People from Rustavi
Footballers from Georgia (country)
Soviet footballers
Association football defenders
Dual internationalists (football)
Soviet Union international footballers
Georgia (country) international footballers
Soviet Union under-21 international footballers
UEFA Euro 1992 players
Soviet Top League players
Russian Premier League players
Allsvenskan players
Bundesliga players
Erovnuli Liga players
FC Metalurgi Rustavi players
FC Dinamo Tbilisi players
GIF Sundsvall players
FC Spartak Moscow players
FC Dynamo Moscow players
Eintracht Frankfurt players
FC Spartak Vladikavkaz players
Manchester City F.C. players
FC Locomotive Tbilisi players
FC Anzhi Makhachkala players
Football managers from Georgia (country)
FC Lokomotivi Tbilisi managers
FC Dinamo Tbilisi managers
FK Standard Sumgayit managers
Georgia national under-21 football team managers
Shamakhi FK managers
Georgia national football team managers
FC Kairat managers
FC Ordabasy managers
Expatriate footballers from Georgia (country)
Expatriate sportspeople from Georgia (country) in Sweden
Expatriate footballers in Sweden
Expatriate sportspeople from Georgia (country) in Germany
Expatriate footballers in Germany
Expatriate sportspeople from Georgia (country) in England
Expatriate footballers in England
Expatriate sportspeople from Georgia (country) in Azerbaijan
Expatriate football managers in Azerbaijan